The Riverside Archeological District is a historic archaeological site in Gill and Greenfield, Massachusetts.  The site added to the National Register of Historic Places in 1975.

Site description
The Riverside Archeological District encompasses a sizable tract of land north of Turners Falls, a major whitewater rapids on the Connecticut River, north of the eponymous village of Turners Falls, Massachusetts in Gill and Greenfield.  Located in northern Massachusetts near the mouths of four major tributaries to the Connecticut, the area has an archaeological history known to date back to the late Pleistocene.  During the earliest contacts between European colonists and Native Americans in the 17th century, the area was known to house major Native encampments, and was the site of the 1676 Battle of Turner's Falls in King Philip's War.  The area has been recognized has archaeologically significant since the 19th century, with well-attested accounts of small finds and some distinctive burial sites.

Formalized archaeology in the area began in the early 20th century with the accumulation of artifacts from Gill in 1915 and 1916 that are now in the collection of the American Indian Archaeological Institute in Washington, DC.  It has continued at low levels of activity throughout the 20th century.

Boundaries
The western boundary of the site is roughly Adams Street in Greenfield; the eastern boundary is in the Lily's Pond area of Barton Cove in Gill, a sheltered area of the Connecticut River.  The northern boundary is just north of Riverside Cemetery in Gill, and the southernmost portion of the area may extend just across the river into the village of Turners Falls.

See also
Dedic Site, in South Deerfield
National Register of Historic Places listings in Franklin County, Massachusetts

References
Levine, Sassaman, and Nassaney, eds. The Archaeological Northeast (Chapter: "The Significance of the Turners Falls Locality in Connecticut River Archaeology" by Michael S. Nassaney). Westport, CT: Bergin & Garvey (1999).

Historic districts on the National Register of Historic Places in Massachusetts
Archaeological sites in Massachusetts
Greenfield, Massachusetts
Archaeological sites on the National Register of Historic Places in Massachusetts
National Register of Historic Places in Franklin County, Massachusetts
Wampanoag